OLE, Ole or Olé may refer to:

 Olé, a cheering expression used in Spain
 Ole (name), a male given name, includes a list of people named Ole
 Object Linking and Embedding, a distributed object system and protocol developed by Microsoft
 OLE Automation, an inter-process communication mechanism developed by Microsoft
 Overhead lines equipment, used to transmit electrical energy to trams, trolleybuses or trains

Computing, mathematics, and engineering
 Object locative environment coordinate system
 Object Linking and Embedding, a proprietary technology developed by Microsoft
 Olé, Spanish search engine which became part of Telefónica's portal Terra in 1999

People
 Ole (name)

Places
 Ole, Estonia, Hiiu County, a village
 Õle, Järva County, Estonia, a village
 Ole, Zanzibar, Tanzania, a village
 Ole, India Country, Mathura district, a village
 OLE, IATA airport code for Cattaraugus County-Olean Airport, New York, United States

Music
 Olé Coltrane, an album by John Coltrane, 1962
 Olé (Johnny Mathis album), 1965
 Olé (Azúcar Moreno album), 1998
 "¡Olé!", a song by The Bouncing Souls from their 1999 album Hopeless Romantic
 Olé (Pearl Jam song), 2011
 "Olé" (Adelén song), 2014
 "Olé" (John Newman song), 2016

Arts
 Olé (group), an international musical comedy trio, formed in 1992
 Olé, a 2006 Italian comedy film
 "Olé!", an episode of Hi Hi Puffy AmiYumi

Other
 Olé (sports newspaper), a morning daily Spanish language sports newspaper from Argentina
 Olé Football Academy, an association football academy based in Wellington, New Zealand
 'Ole language, spoken in western Bhutan
 Ole (cantillation), a cantillation mark ("goes up") found in Psalms, Proverbs, and Job
 National Oceanic and Atmospheric Administration Fisheries Office of Law Enforcement, often abbreviated NOAA OLE
 Other Learning Experience, one of the components in the Hong Kong Diploma of Secondary Education

See also
 Olé, Olé, Olé, a popular football chant
 Olé, Olé (album), a 1995 album by French-Algerian singer Rachid Taha
 "Olé, Olé" (Izhar Cohen song), the Israeli entry in the 1985 Eurovision Song Contest
 "Top of the World" (Olé, Olé, Olé), a 1998 song by Chumbawamba
 Olleh, South Korean e-sports player currently associated with Team Liquid